Hydriomenini is a tribe of geometer moths under subfamily Larentiinae. The tribe was erected by Edward Meyrick in 1872.

Recognized genera
Anachloris Meyrick, 1885
Anomocentris Meyrick, 1891
Aponotoreas Craw, 1986
Carptima Pearsall, 1906
Ceratodalia Packard, 1876
Cyclica Grote, 1882
Ersephila Hulst, 1896
Eurhinosea Packard, 1873
Eutrepsia Herrich-Schäffer, [1855]
Grossbeckia Barnes & McDunnough, 1912
Hammaptera Herrich-Schäffer, 1855
Hydriomena Hübner, 1825
Melitulias Meyrick, 1891
Monostoecha Fletcher, 1979
Notoreas Meyrick, 1885

References

"Tribus Hydriomenini Meyrick, 1872". BioLib.

External links